Oud-Wulven is a hamlet in the Dutch province of Utrecht. It is located just north of the village of Houten, and is part of that municipality.

History 
Oud-Wulven was originally a heerlijkheid (fiefdom). In 1545 it was combined with the neighbouring heerlijkheid Waaijen. "Oud-Wulven en Waaijen" remained a separate entity until 1811, when it merged into Houten. This didn't last long: in 1818 they were combined with the heerlijkheden Wulven, Heemstede, Grote Koppel, Kleine Koppel, Maarschalkerweerd, and Slagmaat to a single municipality called "Oud-Wulven.

Johannes Rothe was Lord of Oud-Wulven and Wayen in the Netherlands (1658–1671). He was a prophetic preacher and Fifth Monarchist. He married in 1660 in Goring House.

The municipality Oud-Wulven had an area of about 10.7 km2, and more than 250 inhabitants in the middle of the 19th century. The municipality was merged back with Houten on 8 September 1857.

Oud-Wulven is not a statistical entity, and the postal authorities have placed it under Houten. It has no place name signs. In 1840, Oud-Wulven was home to 43 people.

Gallery

References

Populated places in Utrecht (province)
Former municipalities of Utrecht (province)
Houten